Howard Ray Johnson (born 16 August 1964) is a Jamaican born American former cricketer. A right-handed batsman and right-arm medium-fast bowler, he played for the United States national cricket team from 2002 until 2005 and played two One Day Internationals (ODIs) during the 2004 ICC Champions Trophy.

Biography

Born in Jamaica in 1964, Howard Johnson first played for the US in the 2002 Americas Championship in Buenos Aires. He made his List A debut in 2004 when he played in the ICC 6 Nations Challenge in the United Arab Emirates and his first-class debut later in the year when he played in the ICC Intercontinental Cup against Canada and Bermuda.

In between the two matches in the Intercontinental Cup, he played in the Americas Championship in Bermuda, winning the man of the match award against the Cayman Islands when he took 5/12.

He last played for the US in the 2005 ICC Trophy in Ireland. After playing a warm-up game against Namibia he played three matches in the tournament proper, against the UAE, Bermuda and Oman. Those three matches also represent the end of his List A career.

References

1964 births
Living people
United States One Day International cricketers
American cricketers
Jamaican emigrants to the United States
American sportspeople of Jamaican descent